Bloomfield Middle School may refer to:
 Bloomfield Middle School, Bloomfield, New Jersey - Bloomfield Public Schools
 Bloomfield Middle School, Macon, Georgia (now closed) - Bibb County School District